Kerdasa is a markaz in Giza Governorate nearby Giza Plateau, Egypt. It is famed for its hand-made textile crafts, woven carpets, and wall hangings in native traditional patterns. Kerdasa is a great place to find embroidered cotton, silk dresses (galabeyas) and other products. It is famous for trading fabrics nationwide, with traditional crafts, and handcrafted clothes and textiles, from dresses, galabiyas, etc., and is a popular destination for Egyptians before Arab and foreign tourists to purchase these products.

Kerdasa town is one of the towns belonging to the Kerdasa Markaz in Giza Governorate in the Arab Republic of Egypt. According to statistics in 2006, the total population of Kerdasa was 69,317 people, including 35,519 men and 33,798 women.

References

Populated places in Giza Governorate